Leisure Studies is an academic journal that publishes original research related to the field of leisure studies. The journal was established in 1982,  and is overseen by the Leisure Studies Association.

References

External links
Journal page entry at the Leisure Studies Association
Aims and scope, Taylor Francis Online

Publications established in 1982
Sociology journals
Bimonthly journals
English-language journals